The Independent Police Investigative Directorate (IPID), formerly the Independent Complaints Directorate (ICD), is an agency of the South African government responsible for investigating complaints against the South African Police Service and municipal police services.

The IPID was created in April 1997 as part of the post-apartheid reform of the South African Police. It investigates deaths in custody, crimes allegedly committed by police officers, violations of SAPS policy, and dissatisfaction with the service provided by the police.

References

External links
 Official website

1997 establishments in South Africa
Government agencies established in 1997
Law enforcement agencies of South Africa
Crime in South Africa
Police oversight organizations